Hightown is a civil parish and a village between Formby and Crosby in Sefton, Merseyside, England.  It contains four buildings that are recorded in the National Heritage List for England as designated listed buildings, all of which are listed at Grade II.  This grade is the lowest of the three gradings given to listed buildings and is applied to "buildings of national importance and special interest".

Hightown was developed as a village to house commuters following the arrival of the railway in the mid 19th century.  Three of the listed buildings pre-date this, and consist of a renovated wayside cross, a farmhouse, and a house that originated as a farmhouse, and the other is a war memorial.

References

Citations

Sources

Listed buildings in Merseyside
Lists of listed buildings in Merseyside